"The Damned Don't Cry" is a song by British pop group Visage, released as a single by Polydor Records in 1982.

Background
Named after the 1950 Joan Crawford film, "The Damned Don't Cry" was the first single from Visage's second album, The Anvil. The cover art of the 7" single differed from that of the 12" single. It was a chart success, becoming Visage's second-highest charting single in the UK (No. 11) and the band's last international hit.

Music video
"The Damned Don't Cry" was the second Visage video directed by Midge Ure. It was shot at Tenterden Town railway station in Kent, and recreates the 1930s atmosphere and mood of the Orient Express. The clip was included on the band's 1986 video release Visage.

Track listing
 7" single (1982)
 "The Damned Don't Cry" – 3:52
 "Motivation" – 3:35

 12" single (1982)
 "The Damned Don't Cry" (Dance Mix) – 5:43
 "Motivation" – 3:46

Personnel
Steve Strange – vocals
Midge Ure – synthesizer
Billy Currie – synthesizer, electric violin
Rusty Egan – electronic drums programming
Dave Formula – synthesizer
Perri Lister – backing vocals
Lorraine Whitmarsh – backing vocals

Chart performance

References

1982 singles
Songs written by Midge Ure
Visage (band) songs
Songs written by Steve Strange
Songs written by Rusty Egan
Songs written by Billy Currie
Songs written by Dave Formula
1981 songs
Polydor Records singles